The 2013–14 Saint Peter's Peacocks men's basketball team represented Saint Peter's University during the 2013–14 NCAA Division I men's basketball season. The Peacocks, led by eighth year head coach John Dunne, played their home games at the Yanitelli Center and were members of the Metro Atlantic Athletic Conference. They finished the season 14–17, 9–11 in MAAC play to finish in a three-way tie for sixth place. They advanced to the quarterfinals of the MAAC tournament to Manhattan.

Roster

Schedule

|-
!colspan=9 style="background:#0000FF; color:#FFFFFF;"| Regular season

|-
!colspan=9 style="background:#0000FF; color:#FFFFFF;"| 2014 MAAC tournament

References

Saint Peter's Peacocks men's basketball seasons
Saint Peter's
Saint
Saint